Daniel Bennequin (3 January 1952) is a French mathematician, known for the Thurston–Bennequin number (sometimes called the Bennequin number) introduced in his doctoral dissertation.

Education and career
Bennequin completed his secondary education at Lycée Condorcet and then graduated from the École normale supérieure. He received his habilitation (Doctoral d'Etat) in 1982 from the University of Paris VII under Alain Chenciner with thesis Entrelacements et équations de Pfaff. He was a professor at the University of Strasbourg before becoming a professor at the University of Paris VII (Institut Mathématique de Jussieu).

Bennequin's dissertation was a major contribution to contact geometry, in which he gave the first example of an exotic contact structure embedded in Euclidean 3-space. On the basis of their work in the 1980s Bennequin and Yakov Eliashberg might be considered the founders of contact topology. Bennequin also works on motion planning. He was a member of Bourbaki.

Selected publications
 L'instanton gordien, d'après P. B. Kronheimer et T. S. Mrowka, Séminaire Bourbaki Nr. 770, 1992/93, numdam
 Monopôles de Seiberg-Witten et conjecture de Thom, d'après Kronheimer, Mrowka et Witten, Séminaire Bourbaki Nr. 807, 1995/96, numdam
 Caustique mystique, d'après Arnold et. al.,  Séminaire Bourbaki, Nr. 634, 1984/85, numdam
 Problèmes elliptiques, surfaces de Riemann et structures symplectiques, d'après M. Gromov, Séminaire Bourbaki, Nr. 657, 1985/86, numdam
 Topologie symplectique, convexité holomorphe et structures de contact, d'après Y. Eliashberg, D. Mc Duff et al, Séminaire Boubaki, Nr. 725, 1989/90, numdam
 Dualités de champs et de cordes, d’après t'Hooft, Polyakov, Witten et al., Séminaire Bourbaki, Nr. 899, 2001/02, numdam
 Les Bords des revêtements ramifiés des surfaces, ENS 1977

References

External links
 Conference in honor of Bennequin, 2012

1952 births
Living people
20th-century French mathematicians
21st-century French mathematicians
Academic staff of the University of Strasbourg
Academic staff of the University of Paris
École Normale Supérieure alumni
Nicolas Bourbaki